Sosnovy Bor is a rural locality (a village) in Usen-Ivanovsky Selsoviet, Belebeyevsky District, Bashkortostan, Russia. The population was 90 as of 2010. There are 3 streets.

Geography 
Sosnovy Bor is located 26 km northeast of Belebey (the district's administrative centre) by road. Krasnaya Zarya is the nearest rural locality.

References 

Rural localities in Belebeyevsky District